DDT, or dichlorodiphenyltrichloroethane, is an insecticide.

DDT may also refer to:

Sciences 
 Deflagration to detonation transition, a type of explosion
 DDT (gene)

Humanities and art 
 DDT (band) (ДДТ), a rock band from Russia 
 D.D.T. (band) a microtonal music group
 Supernaut (Serbian band), formerly known as DDT
 Denkmäler deutscher Tonkunst, a series of editions of German music
 Death Defying Theatre, an Australian theatre company
 Dragostea Din Tei, a single by the Moldovan pop group O-Zone

Sports 
 DDT (professional wrestling), a move in professional wrestling
 DDT Pro-Wrestling (originally Dramatic Dream Team), a Japanese professional wrestling promotion

Technology 
 Allinea Distributed Debugging Tool, a debugger produced by Allinea primarily for debugging parallel programs
 Dynamic Debugging Technique, a debugger in computer programming
 Data-driven testing, a testing concern in model-based testing

Other 
 A transport document for goods shipments to Italy
 An enemy 'Bloon' in the game 'Bloons Tower Defense 6'